The PLK Most Valuable Player award is given annually at the end of the regular season of the Polish Basketball League (PLK), the highest professional basketball league in Poland, to the most valuable player of the league. Originally, the award was given by the now defunct Polish I Liga (Polish League 1), and was called the Polish League 1 Player of the Year. The current award, given by the Polish PLK League, began when that league started, with the 1995–96 season.

I Liga Player of the Year winners (1961–1995)
Player nationalities by national team:

PLK MVP winners (1996–present)

Player nationalities by national team:

 There was no awarding in the 2019–20 season, because the season was cancelled due to the coronavirus pandemic in Poland.

Multiple honors (1996–present)

Players

Player nationality

Teams

References

External links
Polska Liga Koszykówki - Official Site 
Polish League at Eurobasket.com

Basketball most valuable player awards
MVP
European basketball awards